Fernand Mithouard (22 May 1909 – 10 December 1993) was a French professional cyclist from 1933 to 1947; he won the Bordeaux-Paris in 1933.

In 1934 Mithouard traveled to Australia with Paul Chocque to compete in the Centenary 1000, one week road bicycle race over seven stages covering . The race was run in as part of the celebrations of the Centenary of Victoria.  Mithouard was leading the championship when he crashed in stage 6 and abandoned at Omeo.

Palmarès 

 1931
 3rd Paris-Reims
 1932
 Paris-Argentan
 Paris-Chateau Thierry
 Paris-Évreux
 1933
 Bordeaux-Paris
 4th Grand Prix des Nations
 1934
 1st Critérium de l'Écho d'Alger
 Centenary 1000
 1935
 5th  Grand Prix des Nations
 1936
 2ndParis-Tours
 2nd Critérium national
 6th Grand Prix des Nations
 1937
 2nd stage Paris-Nice
 9th Grand Prix des Nations
 1939
 Paris-Saint-Etienne
 General Classification
 1st stage
 3rd Tour de Luxembourg
 1941
 2nd Grand Prix des Nations (free zone)
 5th Paris-Tours
 6thGrand Prix des Nations (occupied zone)
 1942
 6th Grand Prix des Nations (occupied zone)
 1943
 La Flèche française

Results in the Grand tours

Tour de France 
 1936 : abandoned (Stage 7)
 1939 : abandoned (Stage 5)

References

External links 

Official Tour de France results for Fernand Mithouard

French male cyclists
1909 births
1993 deaths
Sportspeople from Yvelines
Cyclists from Île-de-France